Gars is a municipality in the district of Mühldorf in Bavaria in Germany. It is the location of Gars Abbey.

International relations

Gars am Kamp is twinned with the following cities:
 Gars am Kamp, Austria

References

Mühldorf (district)
Populated places on the Inn (river)